Ignat Dishliev (Bulgarian: Игнат Дишлиев; born 8 July 1987 in Plovdiv) is a Bulgarian footballer, who plays as a defender.

Honours

Club
Beroe
Bulgarian Cup (1): 2013
Bulgarian Supercup (1): 2013

References

External links
 

1987 births
Living people
Bulgarian footballers
Association football defenders
PFC Lokomotiv Plovdiv players
FC Lyubimets players
PFC Beroe Stara Zagora players
First Professional Football League (Bulgaria) players
Expatriate footballers in Albania
Bulgarian expatriates in Albania